Centrostachys is a genus of flowering plants belonging to the family Amaranthaceae.

Its native range is Tropical Africa, Tropical and Subtropical Asia.

Species:
 Centrostachys aquatica (R.Br.) Moq.

References

Amaranthaceae
Amaranthaceae genera